The halkieriids  are a group of fossil organisms from the Lower to Middle Cambrian.  Their eponymous genus is Halkieria , which has been found on almost every continent in Lower to Mid Cambrian deposits, forming a large component of the small shelly fossil assemblages.  The best known species is Halkieria evangelista, from the North Greenland Sirius Passet Lagerstätte, in which complete specimens were collected on an expedition in 1989. The fossils were described by Simon Conway Morris and John Peel in a short paper in 1990 in the journal Nature. Later a more thorough description was undertaken in 1995 in the journal Philosophical Transactions of the Royal Society of London and wider evolutionary implications were posed.

The group is sometimes equated to Sachitida, although as originally envisaged, this group includes the wiwaxiids and is thus equivalent to the Halwaxiida.

History of discovery
Armor plates called "sclerites" had long been known as elements of the small shelly fossils, and detailed analysis showed that some of these belonged to the same animal and how they fitted together. The first articulated specimens of Halkieria evangelista, with all their hard parts together, were collected in 1989 from the Sirius Passet lagerstätte in Greenland, and were described in 1990 by Simon Conway Morris and John S. Peel. H. evangelista is used as a model for identifying and reconstructing as halkieriids other similar shells and sclerites; its epithet evangelista reflects its power to explain the Lower Cambrian fossil record.

Description of the fossils

Features shared by Halkieria and Australohalkieria
Only armor-like sclerites of Australohalkieria have been found, and much of the analysis assumes that these animals were similar to Halkieria. However the sclerites are so similar that this assumption looks fairly safe. In both genera the sclerites are of the type called "coelosclerites", which have a mineralized shell around a space originally filled with organic tissue, and which show no evidence of growth by adding material round the outside. Both genera also have sclerites of three different shapes: "palmate", flat and shaped rather like a maple leaf, which are generally the smallest; "cultrate", flat but shaped like knife blades; and "siculate", which are about the same size as the cultrates but are spine-shaped and like rather squashed cylinders. In both Halkieria and Australohalkieria the palmate and cultrate sclerites have prominent ribs, and are fairly flat except for 90° bends at the bases, which indicate that they fitted snugly against the animals' bodies. The siculates mostly lack ribs and appear to have projected away from the body at angles between about 45° and 90°.

Halkieria evangelista

Very near each end there is a shell plate with prominent growth lines rather like the growth rings of trees. The rest of the upper surface was covered with about 2,000 sclerites that overlapped each other like tiles and formed three zones with sclerites of different shapes: "palmates", shaped rather like maple leaves, ran along the center of the back between the shell plates; blade-shaped "cultrates" lay on either side of the palmates and pointing towards the middle of the upper surface; and slim, sickle-shaped "siculates" covered the outer edges. The sclerites bore a wide central cavity, and (at least in some specimens) finer lateral canals. As the animals grew, the shell plates grew by adding material to the outer edges. Individual sclerites stayed the same size; since the cultrate sclerites form a pattern that is constant in all fairly complete specimens, the old ones that were too small may have been shed and replaced by larger ones as the animals grew. The sclerites seem to have grown by basal secretion. There are traces of thin ribs between the sclerites and the skin.

The shellplates and the sclerites were probably made of calcium carbonate originally; it has been suggested on the basis of how they were preserved that they may have been wholly organic, but this is less likely since fossils of non-calcified organisms are usually thin films while Halkeieria fossils are three-dimensional like those of trilobites and hyoliths - in fact several specimens show curvature in the horizontal plane, which suggests that the muscles associated with the sclerites were still present at the
time of burial

The sole was soft and probably muscular. Since Halkieria was unsuited to swimming and had no obvious adaptations for burrowing, it must have lived on the sea-floor, "walking" by making its muscular sole ripple. The backward-projecting siculate sclerites may have improved its grip by preventing it from slipping backwards. Some specimens have been found partially rolled up, rather like a pillbug, and in this position the cultrate sclerites projected outwards, which probably deterred predators. It is difficult to determine the functions of the cap-shaped shells at either end of the animal, as the sclerites appear to have offered adequate protection. Scars on the inner surface of the front shell may indicate that it provided an attachment for internal organs. In one specimen the rear shell appears to have rotated by about 45° before fossilization, which suggests there was a cavity underneath, which may have housed gills.

Traces of a gut have been found in the rear halves of some fossils. Parts of one specimen have been interpreted as a radula, the toothed chitinous tongue that is the signature feature of molluscs, but in this specimen the edge of the "scleritome", i.e. coat of sclerites, is folded and the putative radula could be a group of dislocated siculate sclerites.

Australohalkieria superstes
The name of the most complete and abundant Australian find means "Southern Halkieria the Survivor" because it proves that halkieriids survived the end-Botomian extinction. The sclerites assigned to this species are convex on the upper surface and concave on the lower. They may also curve within their own plane, and they overlap so that the concave side of each is partly covered by the convex side of the next one.  The internal cavity within Australohalkieria is more complicated than the simple tube in Halkieria; about half-way up the sclerite, the cylindrical tube splits into a pair of longitudinal canals, with the central canal flattening; the canals don't seem to be connected.  The walls also have a different microscopic structure.

In A. superstes the central canals of sclerites are flattened on their upper surfaces, and this produces a depression on the upper surface of the tip. The surface of this depression is not mineralized, which suggests the depression may have helped the animals' sense of smell by letting chemicals in the water penetrate the exposed skin. The phosphatic coating on sclerites of A. superstes has features that suggest they were originally covered by a thin organic skin. An outer organic layer has also been found on sclerites of the chancelloriids, sessile organisms that are thought to have looked rather like cacti. If halkieriids were early molluscs, the outer layers of the sclerites may have been similar to the periostracum of some modern molluscs.

The sclerites of A. superstes have right- and left-handed variants which are equally abundant, which suggests that A. superstes was bilaterally symmetrical.

Scleritomes of Early Cambrian halkieriids have many more palmate and cultrate than siculate sclerites. On the other hand, siculate sclerites of A. superstes are more abundant than either cultrate or palmate sclerites; in fact palmate sclerites are rare. Possibly some process after death removed many of the palmates and some of the cultrates, but it is more likely that in A. superstes the part of the scleritome, or "coat of mail", closest to the sea-bed was larger relative to the lateral and dorsal zones further up and towards the center. A. superstes sclerites are also about one-third the size of Early Cambrian halkieriid sclerites. Since the Georgina assemblage includes larger fossils and most Early Cambrian halkieriids are preserved by the same method, phosphatization, it is unlikely that preservational bias has produced an unrepresentative sample. Possible explanations for the small size of A. superstes sclerites include: the individual(s) represented in the Georgina assemblage were juveniles; their scleritomes were composed of many more sclerites than those of Early Cambrian halkieriids; or the species itself was relatively small.

No shells that might be assigned to halkieriids have been found in the Georgina Basin. This does not prove that Australohalkieria lacked shells, as shells of Halkieria are rarely found.

Australohalkieria parva
This species, whose name means "Small Southern Halkieria", was first described in 1990. Like A. superstes, its sclerites have undivided longitudinal canals and a very similar structure to their walls wall, but A. parva has sclerites whose central canals are not flattened.

Other halkieriid fossils from Australia
The other sclerites from the Georgina Basin are different enough to be excluded from Australohalkieria  superstes, but are not sufficiently abundant to provide enough detail for them to be classified. One type is very similar to those of A.superstes, even having a two-pronged tip, but the middle canal is not flattened. The other has a flattened central canal and no longitudinal canals, and may represent an additional Middle Cambrian halkieriid genus, distinct from Australohalkieria and from the Early Cambrian Halkieria.

Siphogonuchitids

Siphogonuchitids have two sclerite morphs as well as their shell(s), thus may have had a simpler scleritome than Halkieria and its ilk, concordant with the sclerites' simpler internal anatomy.

The genera Siphogonuchites, Dabashanites, Lopochites, and Maikhanella all seem to represent components of the Siphogonuchites animal.
Sclerites of Drepanochites can be distinguished based on their aspect ratio.

Maikhanella is shell formed of Siphogonuchites sclerites that are fused together with a calcified matrix.  Juvenile shells appear not to incorporate sclerites.
The central cavity of the Siphogonuchites sclerite is simple, with no lateral chambers attached.

Ninellids 
The ninellids, typified by Ninella, are a Lower Cambrian group that had an even simpler scleritome, with only one sclerite type (although variation in the morphology of the sclerites is observed, and left- and right-sided sclerites exist).  Their sclerites are hooked or scoop-like, and are very similar to halkieriid or siphonogunuchitid sclerites; they were hollow and calcareous and had a ridged upper surface.

Hippopharangites
Hippopharangites has sclerites with a broad central cavity and small pores opening through the shell wall, equivalent to the lateral chambers of other halkieriids (and the aesthete canals of Chitons?)
This genus is the closest in form to Chancelloriid sclerites, and is thus used to support the union of halkieriids and chancelloriids as Coeloscleritophora.

Lomasulcachites
Lomasulcachites is a further genus known from sclerites alone.

Sachites
Sachites Meshkova 1969 is a genus that comprised spiny sclerites; many Sachites specimens are now referred to other halkieriid taxa.

Although believed to be related to the halkieriids, a chancelloriid affinity has more recently been proposed.

Sinosachites

Sinosachites is a genus of 'halkieriid' known only from sclerites; these have internal chambers that are sub-perpendicular to the central canal, to which they are connected by narrow channels.  The chambers are the same diameter, ~40 µm, as the longitudinal canals in Australohalkieria; their greater number and arrangement as lateral rather than longitudinal bodies reflects the greater size of the Sinosachites sclerites, which measure about 1–2 mm in length.

The sclerites are synonymous with Thambetolepis, which was originally described from Australia.
Left-hand and right-hand sclerites exist, so the animal was bilaterally symmetrical; as in Halkieria, palmate, cultrate and siculate sclerite morphologies exist.

Oikozetetes
The two types are thought to be the front and rear shells of a halkieriid.

They were probably calcareous while the organism was alive (although diagenesis sometimes replaces the original mineral with another, such as silica).  It is thought to also have borne an armour coat consisting of biomineralised sclerites, like Halkieria.  These are never found in direct association with the shells, but there are many biostratinomic processes which could account for this fact.

The lower Cambrian taxon Ocruranus (=Eohalobia) is putatively equivalent to the shells of Oikozetetes and seemingly belonged to a halkieriid-type body, although an intermediate valve suggests a Palaeoloricate-like body form.

Occurrence

The only reasonably complete specimens, of Halkieria evangelista, were found in the Sirius Passet lagerstätte in Greenland. Fragments which are confidently classified as belonging to halkieriids have been found in China's Xinjiang province and Australia's Georgina Basin, while shells of a possible halkieriid have been found in Canada's Burgess Shale. Halkieriid-like armor plates, called "sclerites" have been found in many other places as part of the small shelly fauna.

The earliest known occurrences of Halkieriids sclerites, classified as Halkieria longa, date from the Purella antiqua Zone of the Upper Nemakit-Daldynian Stage in Siberia. The mass extinction at the end of the Cambrian period's Botomian age was thought to have wiped out most of the small shellies, including the halkieriids, but in 2004 Halkieriid fossils classified as Australohalkieria were reported from Mid-Cambrian rocks of the Georgina Basin in Australia. It is not known why this clade would have survived while other halkieriid clades apparently died. It may be significant that the only archaeocyathans known to have survived the end-Botomian extinction also occur in Gondwana, the old super-continent that embraced South America, Africa, India, Australia and Antarctica.

Halkieriids and other small shelly fossils are typically, although not always, preserved in phosphate, which may or may not have been their original mineral composition.  Preservation by a covering of phosphate only seems to have been common during the early Cambrian, becoming rarer with time as a result of increased disturbance of sea-floors by burrowing animals. Hence it is possible that halkieriids and other small shelly fossils were alive earlier than the earliest known fossils and later than the latest known fossils — paleontologists call this kind of uncertainty the Signor–Lipps effect.

Species
Nearly all members of the genera Halkieria are known only from finds of isolated scaly sclerites:

Halkieria alata Duan, 1984
Halkieria amorpha Meshkova,1974
Halkieria bisulcata Qian et Yin, 1984
Halkieria costulata Meshkova, 1974
Halkieria curvativa Mambetov in Missarzhevsky and Mambetov, 1981
Halkieria deplanatiformis Mambetov in Missarzhevsky and Mambetov, 1981
Halkieria desquamata Duan, 1984
Halkieria directa Mostler, 1980
Halkieria elonga Qian et Yin, 1984
Halkieria equilateralis Qian et Yin, 1984
Halkieria folliformis Duan, 1984
Halkieria fordi Landing, 1991
Halkieria hexagona Mostler, 1980
Halkieria lata Mostler, 1980
Halkieria longa Qian, 1977
Halkieria longispinosa Mostler, 1980
Halkieria maidipingensis Qian, 1977
Halkieria mina Qian, Chen et Chen, 1979
Halkieria mira Qian et Xiao, 1984
Halkieria obliqua Poulsen, 1967
Halkieria operculus Qian, 1984
?Halkieria pennata He, 1981 [=?Halkieria sthenobasis Jiang in Luo et al., 1982]
Halkieria phylloidea He, 1981
Halkieria praeinguis Jiang in Luo et al., 1982
Halkieria projecta Bokova, 1985
Halkieria sacciformis Meshkova, 1969
Halkieria solida Mostler, 1980
Halkieria sthenobasis Jiang in Luo et al., 1982
Halkieria stonei Landing, 1989
Halkieria symmetrica Poulsen, 1967
Halkieria terastios Qian, Chen et Chen, 1979
Halkieria uncostata Qian et Yin, 1984
Halkieria undulata Wang, 1994
Halkieria ventricosa Mostler, 1980
Halkieria wangi Demidenko, 2010 
Halkieria zapfei Mostler, 1980

At present, the structure of complete scleritome is known only for the single species named Halkieria evangelista from the Lower Cambrian of Greenland (Sirius Passet Formation).

Phylogenetic position of Halkieria

The evolutionary relationships of the halkieriids are a complex topic which is still being debated. Most of this debate is about their relationship to Wiwaxia and to the three major lophotrochozoan phyla — molluscs, annelids and brachiopods. The question of their relationship to an apparently much more primitive Cambrian group, the chancelloriids is also significant and may raise some difficult questions.

Relationship to Molluscs, Annelids and Brachiopods

In 1995 Conway Morris and Peel presented a cladogram based both on the fossils' features and on early 1990s research in molecular phylogeny, which is the application of cladistic analysis to DNA and RNA:
The siphogonotuchids, a group found in Earliest Cambrian rocks, were the "sister" group to all the rest. These are known only from isolated fragments.
The earliest halkieriids were a "sister" group to the molluscs, in other words descendants of a fairly closely related common ancestor. This relationship, they said, was supported by the muscular foot that most researchers assumed halkieriids had.
Another halkieriid genus, Thambetolepis / Sinosachites, was a "great aunt" of annelids and Wiwaxia was an "aunt" of annelids. Their claim of a close relationship between halkieriids and Wiwaxia was based on both groups' having sclerites divided into three concentric zones. The close relationship of Wiwaxia to annelids was based on the similarities Butterfield (1990) found between Wiwaxia’s sclerites and the bristles of polychaete annelids. Canadia is a Burgess Shale fossil that is widely agreed to be a polychaete.
Halkieria evangelista, which Conway Morris had found in Greenland's Sirius Passet lagerstätte, was a "sister" group" to brachiopods, animals whose modern forms have bivalve shells but differ from molluscs in having muscular stalks and a distinctive feeding apparatus, the lophophore. Brachiopods have bristles that are similar to those of annelids and hence to Wiwaxia’s sclerites, and hence to halkieriid sclerites.  A brachiopod affinity seemed plausible because brachiopods pass through a larval phase that resembles a halkieriid, and some isolated fossil shells thought to belong to halkieriids had a brachiopod-like microstructure.

In 2003 Cohen, Holmer and Luter supported the halkieriid-brachiopod relationship, suggesting that brachiopods may have arisen from a halkieriid lineage that developed a shorter body and larger shells, and then folded itself and finally grew a stalk out of what used to be the back.

Vinther and Nielsen (2005) proposed instead that Halkieria was a crown group mollusc, in other words more similar to modern molluscs that to annelids, brachiopods or any intermediate groups. They argued that: Halkieria’s sclerites resembled those of the modern solenogaster aplacophoran shell-less molluscs (see ), of some modern polyplacophoran molluscs, which have several shell plates, and of the Ordovician polyplacophoran Echinochiton; Halkieria’s shells are more similar to the shells of conchiferan molluscs, since shells of both of these groups show no trace of the canals and pores seen in polyplacophoran shell plates; the bristles of brachiopods and annelids are similar to each other but not to Halkieria’s sclerites.

Caron, Scheltema, Schander and Rudkin (2006) also interpreted Halkieria as a crown group mollusc, with Wiwaxia and Odontogriphus as stem group molluscs, in other words "sister" and "aunt" of the crown group molluscs. Their main reason for regarding Halkieria as crown group molluscs is that both possessed armor mineralized with calcium carbonate. They treated Wiwaxia and Odontogriphus as stem group molluscs because in their opinion both possessed the distinctive molluscan radula, a chitonous toothed "tongue".

Also in 2006, Conway Morris criticized Vinther and Nielsen's (2005) classification of Halkieria as a crown group mollusc, on the grounds that the growth of the spicules in the aplacophorans and polyplacophorans is not similar to the method of growth deduced for the complex halkieriid sclerites; in particular, he said, the hollow spines of various molluscs are not at all like the halkieriid sclerites with their complex internal channels. Conway Morris repeated his earlier conclusion that halkieriids were close to the ancestors of both molluscs and brachiopods.

Butterfield (2006) accepted that Wiwaxia and Odontogriphus were closely related, but argued that they were stem-group polychaetes rather than stem-group molluscs. In his opinion the feeding apparatus of these organisms, which consisted of two or at most four rows of teeth, could not perform the functions of the "belt-like" molluscan radula with their numerous tooth-rows; the different tooth-rows in both Wiwaxia and Odontogriphus tooth-rows also have noticeably different shapes, while those of molluscan radulae are produced one after the other by the same group of "factory" cells and therefore are almost identical. He also regarded lines running across the middle region of Odontogriphus fossils as evidence of external segmentation, since the lines are evenly spaced and run exactly at right angles to the long axis of the body. As in his earlier papers, Butterfield emphasized the similarities of internal structure between Wiwaxia’s sclerites and the bristles of polychaetes, and the fact that polychaetes are the only modern organisms in which some of the bristles form a covering over the back.

Conway Morris and Caron (2007) published the first description of Orthrozanclus reburrus. This resembled the halkieriids in having concentric bands of sclerites, although only two and not mineralized; and one shell at what was presumed to be the front and which was similar in shape to Halkieria’s front shell. It also had long spines rather like those of Wiwaxia. Conway Morris and Caron regarded this creature as evidence that the "halwaxiids" were a valid taxon and were monophyletic, in other words shared a common ancestor with each other and with no other organism. They published two cladograms, representing alternative hypotheses about the evolution of the lophotrochozoa, the lineage that includes molluscs, annelids and brachiopods:

 This is the more likely, although it falls apart if the organisms' characteristics are changed even slightly:
Kimberella and Odontogriphus are early, primitive molluscs, without sclerites or any kind of mineralized armor.
Wiwaxia, the siphogonotuchids, Orthrozanclus and Halkieria from a side-branch of the mollusc family tree, which diverged in that order. This would mean that: Wiwaxia was the first of them to have sclerites, which were unmineralized; the siphogonotuchids were the first to have mineralized sclerites, although the scleritome was simpler; halkieriids then develop more complex scleritomes, while in Orthrozanclus the scleritome became unmineralized again and the rear shell vanished or became so  small that it has not been seen in fossils. This hypothesis faces the difficulty that siphogonotuchids appear in earlier rocks and have simpler scleritomes than the other three groups.
The annelids and brachiopods evolved from the other main branch of the family tree, which did not include the molluscs.
 The alternative view is:
Kimberella and Odontogriphus are early, primitive lophotrochozoans.
The siphogonotuchids, Halkieria, Orthrozanclus and Wiwaxia form a group that is closer to the shared ancestor of annelids and brachiopods than it is to the molluscs. The siphogonotuchids are the first of the group to become distinctive, with two types of mineralized sclerites and a "shell" made of fused sclerites. Halkieriids had three types of sclerites and two one-piece shells. In Orthrozanclus the sclerites became unmineralized and in Wiwaxia the shells were lost.

The network of internal cavities within sclerites of the halkieriid Sinosachites have been likened to the aesthete canals in polyplacophora, strengthening the case for a molluscan affinity.

Relationship to chancelloriids

Porter (2008) revived an early 1980s idea that the sclerites of Halkieria are extremely similar to those of chancelloriids. These were sessile, bag-like, radially symmetric organisms with an opening at the top.

Since their fossils show no signs of a gut or other organs, they were originally classified as some kind of sponge. Butterfield and Nicholas (1996) argued that they were closely related to sponges on the grounds that the detailed structure of chancellorid sclerites is similar to that of fibers of spongin, a collagen protein, in  modern keratose (horny) demosponges. However Janussen, Steiner and Zhu (2002) opposed this view, arguing that: spongin does not appear in all Porifera, but may be a defining feature of the demosponges; the silica-based spines of demosponges are solid, while chancellorid sclerites are hollow and filled with soft tissues connected to the rest of the animal at the bases of the sclerites; chancellorid sclerites were probably made of aragonite, which is not found in demosponges; sponges have loosely bound-together skins called pinacoderms, which are only one cell thick, while the skins of chancellorids were much thicker and shows signs of connective structures called belt desmosomes. In their opinion the presence of belt desmosomes made chancellorids members of the Epitheliazoa, the next higher taxon above the Porifera, to which sponges belong. They thought it was difficult to say whether chancellorids were members of the Eumetazoa, "true animals" whose tissues are organized into Germ layers: chancellorids' lack of internal organs would seem to exclude them from the Eumetazoa; but possibly chancellorids descended from Eumetazoans that lost these features after becoming sessile filter-feeders.  There are intriguing hints that the Ediacaran genus Ausia may represent a halkieriid ancestor with strong similarity to the chancelloriids.

The coelosclerites ("hollow sclerites") of halkieriids and chancelloriids resemble each other at all levels: both have an internal "pulp cavity" and a thin external organic layer; the walls are made of the same material, aragonite; the arrangement of the aragonite fibers is in each is the same, running mainly from base to tip but with each being closer to the surface at the end nearest the tip. It is extremely improbable that totally unrelated organisms could have developed such similar sclerites independently, but the huge difference in the structures of their bodies makes it hard to see how they could be closely related. This dilemma may be resolved in various ways:
 One possibility is that chancelloriids evolved from bilaterian ancestors but then adopted a sessile lifestyle and rapidly lost all unnecessary features. However the gut and other internal organs have not been lost in other bilaterians that lost their external bilateral symmetry, such as echinoderms, priapulids, and kinorhynchs.
 On the other hand, perhaps chancelloriids are similar to the organisms from which bilaterians evolved. That would imply that the earliest bilaterians had similar coelosclerites.
 One solution to this dilemma may be that preservation of small shelly fossils by coatings of phosphate was common only  for a relatively short time, during the Early Cambrian, and that coelosclerite-bearing organisms were alive several million years before and after the time of phosphatic preservation.
 Alternatively, perhaps the common ancestor of both chancelloriids and halkieriids had very similar but unmineralized coelosclerites, and some intermediate groups independently incorporated aragonite into these very similar structures.

See also
 Coeloscleritophoran

Notes

External links
Palaeos' article on Halkieria  & H. evangelista 
Pharyngula entry  on Orthrozanclus reburrus

Cambrian molluscs
Cambrian invertebrates
Cambrian animals of Africa
Cambrian animals of Asia
Cambrian animals of Europe
Cambrian animals of North America
Cambrian animals of Oceania
Cambrian first appearances
Cambrian extinctions
Sirius Passet fossils
Cambrian genus extinctions